Megachile trichorhytisma is a species of bee in the family Megachilidae. It was described by Engel in 2006.

References

Trichorhytisma
Insects described in 2006